Intrastate could refer to:
 Intrastate Interstate Highway
 Intrastate airline